Sapargali Begalin (24 November 1895 – 10 March 1983) was a Kazakh poet. He also wrote a number of short stories.

His son Mazhit Begalin became a film actor and director.

References

1895 births
Place of birth missing
1983 deaths
Kazakhstani poets
Soviet poets